The 146th district of the Texas House of Representatives contains parts of Houston. The current Representative is Shawn Thierry, who has represented the district since 2017.

References 

146